Union City Township is one of eighteen townships in Allamakee County, Iowa, USA.  At the 2010 census, its population was 219.

History
Union City Township was organized in 1852. The township is named from an early settlement on the north side of the Upper Iowa River above the mouth of French Creek.

Geography
According to the USGS, it contains three cemeteries: Mount Hope, Portland Prairie and Wheatland.

References

External links
 US-Counties.com
 City-Data.com

Townships in Allamakee County, Iowa
Townships in Iowa
1852 establishments in Iowa
Populated places established in 1852